Pritchardia lanaiensis, the Lānai pritchardia,  is a species of fan palm that is endemic to Hawaii in the United States. It can only be found on the island of Lānai.

References

lanaiensis
Endemic flora of Hawaii
Biota of Lanai
Trees of Hawaii
Taxa named by Odoardo Beccari
Taxonomy articles created by Polbot